| tries = {{#expr: 
 +  2 +  7 + 13 +  8 +  7 + 12 +  9 +  5 +  4 +  5 +  7 +  6 +  8 +  1
 +  5 +  5 +  2 +  8 + 11 +  9 +  9 + 12 +  3 +  5 + 13 +  5 +  6 + 13
 +  5 +  7 +  1 +  4 +  7 +  1 +  2 +  5
 +  4 +  3 +  7 +  2 +  4 +  3 +  7 +  4
 +  5 +  4 +  5 +  3 +  3 +  4 +  6 +  1
 +  6 +  5 +  7 +  4
 +  4
}}
| top point scorer = (120 points)
| top try scorer = (6 tries)
| venue = Madejski Stadium, Reading, Berkshire
| attendance2 = 13,123	
| champions =  NEC Harlequins
| count = 2
| runner-up =   Montferrand
| website = https://web.archive.org/web/20080506141030/http://www.ercrugby.com/eng/
| previous year = 2002–03
| previous tournament = 2002–03 Parker Pen Challenge Cup
| next year = 2004–05
| next tournament = 2004–05 European Challenge Cup
}}
The 2003–04 European Challenge Cup (known as the Parker Pen Challenge Cup for sponsorship reasons) was the 8th season of the European Challenge Cup, Europe's second tier club rugby union competition below the Heineken Cup. A total of 28 teams participated, representing seven countries.  This was the first year of the competition following the introduction of regional rugby union teams in Wales.  With the reduction of Welsh teams from nine to five, and with all teams participating in the 2003-04 Heineken Cup, there were no Welsh teams in the 2003–04 Parker Pen Challenge Cup.

The competition began when Rotherham hosted Narbonne and Leonessa hosted Montferrand on 5 December 2003 and culminated in the final at the Madejski Stadium in Reading on 22 May 2004.

As in the previous season, the competition was organised in a knockout format. Teams played each other on a home and away basis, with the aggregate points winner proceeding to the next round. The final was a single leg. For the second time, a third tier tournament was held - the European Shield. This was contested between the first round losers from the European Challenge Cup.  As there were only 28 teams involved, the 2 "best" 1st Round losers were reprieved and proceeded to the 2nd Round.

The defending champions, England's London Wasps, did not have a chance to defend their crown because they qualified to play in the Heineken Cup.  NEC Harlequins claimed the narrowest of victories over Montferrand in the final and picked up their second piece of European Club silverware.

Teams
The allocation of teams was as follows:
England: 6 teams — all teams from the Zurich Premiership that did not qualify for the 2003–04 Heineken Cup
France:  10 teams — all teams from the Top 16 that did not qualify for the Heineken Cup
Ireland: 1 team — the Irish team from the Celtic League that did not play in the Heineken Cup
Italy: 8 teams — all the teams from the Super 10 that did not qualify for the Heineken Cup
Scotland: 1 team — the Scottish team from the Celtic League that did not play in the Heineken Cup
Spain: 2 teams — drawn from the División de Honor de Rugby

Matches
All kickoff times are local to the match location.

Round 1

1st Leg

2nd Leg

Aggregate Results
{| class="wikitable"
|+ Key to colours
|-
|                        |    
|14 winners and 2 best losers advance to 2nd Round.
|-
|style="background:#cfc;"|    
|12 other teams to Shield.
|}

Round 2

1st Leg

2nd Leg

Aggregate Results

Quarter-finals

1st Leg

2nd Leg

Aggregate Results

Semi-finals

1st Leg

2nd Leg

Aggregate Results

Final

See also
2003-04 Heineken Cup
European Challenge Cup
2003–04 European Shield

References

 
2003–04 rugby union tournaments for clubs
2003-04
2003–04 in European rugby union
2003–04 in English rugby union
2003–04 in French rugby union
2003–04 in Irish rugby union
2003–04 in Italian rugby union
2003–04 in Romanian rugby union
2003–04 in Spanish rugby union
2003–04 in Scottish rugby union